Magnús Ólafsson (born 17 February 1946) is an Icelandic actor, comedian, singer and former handball player. A veteran stage and film actor of several decades, he is best known for his performance of the character Bjössi Bolla which was created when he was a member of the comedy band Sumargleðin in the early 1980's along with Ragnar Bjarnason, Ómar Ragnarsson, Bessi Bjarnason and Þorgeir Ástvaldsson. With Sumargleðin, he sang the hit song Prins Póló in 1981.

Handball career

Magnús played as a goalkepper for FH's handball team for several season, winning the Icelandic championship in 1974 and 1976 and the Icelandic Cup for three straight years from 1975 to 1977. He also won several outdoor handball national championships with FH.

Personal life
Magnús is married to Elísabet Sonja Harðardóttir and with her has four children. He is the father of former footballer Hörður Magnússon and his nephew was actor Stefán Karl Stefánsson.

Partial filmography

Land og synir (1980)
 Óðal feðranna (1980)
Hvítir mávar (1985) – Pétur Kristjánsson
 Children of Nature (1991)
 Ingaló (1992) – Seli
 Bíódagar (1994) – Hallur 
 Cold Fever (1994) – Hallur 
 The Viking Sagas (1994) – Bjorn
 Agnes (1995) – Eyfi
 Devil's Island (1996) – Hreggviður
Falcons  (2002) – Lobbi
 Metalhead (2013) – Erlingur

References

External links

Living people
1946 births
Magnús Ólafsson
Magnús Ólafsson
Magnús Ólafsson
Magnús Ólafsson
Magnús Ólafsson
Magnús Ólafsson